Ontario Motor Speedway was a motorsport venue located in Ontario, California. It was the first and only automobile racing facility built to accommodate major races sanctioned by all of the four dominant racing sanctioning bodies: USAC (and now IndyCar Series) for open-wheel oval car races; NASCAR for a  oval stock car races; NHRA for drag races; and FIA for Formula One road course races. Additionally, several motorcycle races were held at the track. Constructed in less than two years, the track opened in August 1970 and was considered state of the art at the time.

The first full year of racing included the Indy-style open wheel Inaugural California 500 on September 6, 1970; the Miller High Life 500 stock car race on February 28, 1971, the NHRA Super Nationals drag race on November 21, 1970 and the Questor Grand Prix on March 28, 1971.  Each of these inaugural races drew attendance second only to their established counterparts, the USAC Indianapolis 500, the NASCAR Daytona 500, the NHRA U.S. Nationals, and the U.S. Formula One race at Watkins Glen.

The track was purchased for real estate development by Chevron Land Company in late 1980 and demolished at a cost of $3 million in 1981. It is estimated that the  facility, with 155,000 permanent seats and an air-conditioned private stadium club would have a replacement cost in 2009 of over $350 million.

History

In the mid-sixties, there were two prior attempts to build "The Indianapolis of the West". The first attempt was led by National General Corporation, and the second by the Santa Anita Consolidated and Filmways Corporations.

William Loorz CEO of Stolte Construction Co., one of California's largest commercial construction companies, who had been designated the contractor on the project, sent information on the failed projects to David Lockton, co-founder with Chuck Barnes of Sports Headliners, a leading sports management firm in Indianapolis, Indiana, that acted as agent and manager for most of the Formula One and Indianapolis-style racing drivers.

Sports Headliners represented most of the leading Formula One drivers and the winners of the past 10 Indianapolis  races. Lockton was convinced that the prior efforts failed for lack of involvement with anyone familiar with the automobile racing community. He flew to Los Angeles in October 1966, met with Stolte and viewed the proposed site which had by then been subdivided into fourteen separate parcels owned by 150 individual owners, many of them Hollywood celebrities who had bought the land for tax shelters.

Lockton spent the next nine months acquiring options on all of the fourteen parcels and then leveraged his position as the drivers’ representative on the board of USAC (United States Auto Club) the sanctioning body for the Indianapolis 500 race; and his personal friendship with Tony Hulman, owner of the Indianapolis Motor Speedway to obtain not only the promise of a USAC sanctioned  race, but also the commitment and involvement of Indianapolis Motor Speedway personnel. He obtained the first and only IRS ruling to allow tax deductibility of the $25.5 million industrial revenue bond offering secured by the real estate, in which the facility would be run by a for-profit operating company.

Lockton convinced leading bond investment banker John Nuveen & Co. in Chicago as well as Citi Securities Corporation in Indianapolis to underwrite the bond offering. He also raised $5 million in equity from Pioneer Lands Corp.; Donaldson, Lufkin & Jenrette; and Stolte Construction Company; with Lockton and these three entities owning the speedway in more or less equal proportions. Renowned California architect Robert W. Kite AIA whose firm, Kite & Overpeck Architects, Beverly Hills, was retained by Stolte to design the state-of-the-art facility The track layout was designed by Dutch Circuit designer John Hugenholtz (Managing Director of the Zandvoort Formula 1 circuit), who also designed Suzuka in Japan, Zolder, Jarama, Nivelles, Hockenheim and other circuits.. Robert (Bob) Kite traveled extensively throughout the United States and Europe to research the design of the facility. Track management planned to make OMS as a replica of the Indianapolis Motor Speedway with many important enhancements. The racing surface was one lane wider and, unlike the Indy speedway, the short chutes (the two shorter straight-aways, at either end of the track) were banked, which made the OMS slightly faster.

In addition, the OMS was built with an infield road course, making it a facility for both oval and road course style racing in addition to drag racing. At the time, the Indianapolis Motor Speedway, familiarly known as "the Brickyard" did not have an infield road course and one was not built there until 2000. The Indianapolis track, which was first built in 1909, was originally paved at great expense with 3.2 million paving bricks. Today, 3 feet (0.91 m) of original bricks remain at the start-finish line, still giving meaning to "the Brickyard". To symbolize Hulman's gesture of friendship with Lockton and support for the "Indy of the West", he provided a special gift from Indy: a circle of the original bricks from the Indianapolis Motor Speedway were laid in the OMS's victory lane.

The Ontario Motor Speedway introduced many innovations to the sport of automobile racing and is attributed as being the facility that started the boom in development of similar super speedways which made automobile racing track ownership one of the highest growth segments from 1980 to 2005. Ontario pioneered a private stadium club with annual memberships, corporate suites, crash absorbent retaining walls and safety fences, the first pro-am celebrity race, state-of-the-art modern garage facilities for the race teams, and a computerized real-time timing and scoring system which showed in real-time the positions on the track to spectators during the race. This timing and scoring system was subsequently adopted by the Formula One circuit and ultimately by the Indianapolis Motor Speedway.

The OMS was designed by the renowned architectural firm Kite & Overpeck Architects, Beverly Hills, known for important LA landmarks such as the 9000 Sunset Building and the Beverly Hillcrest Hotel. The principal in charge of the OMS was Robert W. Kite AIA. The K&O project team included Ted Tyler.  During the 22-month construction period, speedway management negotiated the required race dates from the rival sanctioning bodies, convincing the FIA (Federation Internationale de L’Automobile) to allow a second U.S. Grand Prix in 1972, contingent upon conducting a qualifying race (the Questor Grand Prix) in 1971.

The OMS was the first automobile race facility to launch a multimillion-dollar marketing campaign based on extensive market research. The research indicated that in order to attract more than the approximately 50,000 hardcore racing fans in Southern California it would be necessary to convince the non-racing fan of the new speedway's safety to overcome their fears of seeing a terrible accident; to position the facility as a clean, safe, fun place to take the family, and a place to rub elbows with Hollywood stars, astronauts and other celebrities. The speedway launched a radio, billboard and newspaper advertising campaign, developed by the Los Angeles-based Campbell Ewald Agency, in December 1969, promoting the California 500 as "the place for the family to be for their Labor Day weekend" nine months later.

Legendary Hollywood PR agent, Warren Cowan of the Rogers & Cowan public relations agency heavily promoted the Hollywood community and the astronauts’ interest in the sport and involvement with the track. During races the suites were full of celebrities, including Paul Newman, Kirk Douglas, Dick Smothers, John Wayne, James Garner and Ina Balin, as well as many astronauts, including Pete Conrad. The dedication of the track occurred in August 1970 with the staging of the first celebrity pro-am race, featuring many stars from the entertainment industry paired with professional, race winning drivers. The celebrity pro-am race was subsequently aired as a TV special on NBC.

The speedway's board of directors when the track opened consisted of chairman Dan Lufkin, of Donaldson, Lufkin, Jenrette; CEO David Lockton; Donald Riehl, of DLJ; William Loorz, CEO of Stolte Construction; Paul Newman, Kirk Douglas, and Dick Smothers from the entertainment industry; J.C. Agajanian, an American motor sport promoter and race car owner; Parnelli Jones, 1963 winner of the Indianapolis 500; Roger Penske, retired race car driver, race car owner and auto related business entrepreneur; Briggs Cunningham, an American sportsman who raced cars and yachts; and Chuck Barnes, chairman and CEO of Sports Headliners, and former director of public relations for Firestone Tires.

The advertising campaign was so successful that all reserved seats were completely sold out over six weeks before the inaugural California 500. The 178,000 in paid attendance and $3.3 million gross remained the largest crowd and highest gross in inflation adjusted dollars of any single day sporting event other than the Indianapolis 500 for nearly three decades. California governor Ronald Reagan presented the trophy to race winner Jim McElreath, a teammate of car owner A. J. Foyt. President Richard M. Nixon was represented at the event by his daughter Tricia Nixon, and her husband, Ed Cox.

The second event, the Mattel Hot Wheels Super Nationals Drag Race on November 20, drew a crowd second only to the NHRA Championships in Indianapolis, Indiana and the Ontario drag strip proved to be the fastest ever with many world records set. The NASCAR sanctioned Miller High Life  stock car race on February 28, 1971, drew a crowd of 80,000 and was the third largest crowd to see the first low bank 2-1/2 mile oval  stock car race, and the third largest attendance for a stock car race behind the Daytona 500 and the Talladega 500. The Questor Grand Prix, won by Mario Andretti on March 28, 1971, was a head-to-head battle between European drivers using Formula One cars against the U.S. Formula 5000 series. This format was a precondition to receipt of a second FIA sanctioned U.S. Grand Prix. The crowd of only 55,000, while the largest to attend a road race in California, was a disappointment; even so, the speedway's schedule of upcoming events printed on page 130 of the 1971 California 500 official program listed a "Second Annual Questor Grand Prix" taking place on April 9 as "One of two full-points World Championship Formula 1 races scheduled for the U.S. next year."

From a racing standpoint, the inaugural season was a tremendous success and from an attendance standpoint only the hybrid Questor Grand Prix was a disappointment. In April, 1971, Lockton resigned as CEO from Ontario (as well as from Sports Headliners) to pursue non-automobile racing related interests and was replaced as CEO by Ray Smartis, the vice president and general manager. Despite the speedway's commercial success in building attendance for each event and the clear potential for future profitability, in the short term, the operating company had difficulty meeting its debt service obligations on the municipal bonds, primarily due to the shortfall of the hybrid Questor Grand Prix race and a downturn in California 500 attendance in year two.

The advertising campaign for the Inaugural California 500 had guaranteed seat purchasers seat renewal rights in perpetuity if they paid for them within 30 days of the last race. Over 20% of the seats for the second 1972 Cal 500 event were sold on this promotion, providing the OMS with almost $800,000 in advance ticket sales. Rather than a sustained campaign, the advertising or promotional money was not spent on the 1972 race until only a few weeks before the event and attendance was marginally down approximately 30,000 in the second year.

In 1973 the operating company was sold and in a desperate attempt to make the debt service payments the new operators devised a strategy to stage two California 500 races in one fiscal year. For the third California 500, the established and popular Labor Day date was sacrificed for a March 10 date, despite the evidence from extensive original market, traffic and weather research that Labor Day weekend was by a considerable margin the date with the largest potential attendance. The March crowds never approached the attendance of the Labor Day event and the new operator ultimately defaulted on the debt service.

Ontario was used in a number of TV shows and movies, including Salvage One, Charlie's Angels, Death Race 2000 and was also mentioned in CHiPs.

Other events
Attempts were made to provide revenue by holding other events and concerts to promote the track venue more.

On February 28, 1971, OMS promoted and staged motorcycle daredevil Evel Knievel's record jump over 19 cars, drawing a crowd of 50,000 in paid attendance on the day prior to the NASCAR sanctioned Miller High Life 500 mile stock car race. The jump was filmed as the climactic scene in the movie Evel Knievel, starring George Hamilton, which was filmed in and around the race track during that weekend.

California Jam was held on April 6, 1974. This rock festival concert drew a crowd of 300-400,000, the largest paid attendance for a rock concert. Portions of the concert were televised live on ABC. The performers included (in order of appearance) Rare Earth, Earth, Wind & Fire, Eagles, Seals and Crofts, Black Oak Arkansas, Black Sabbath, Deep Purple and Emerson, Lake & Palmer.

California Jam II was held on March 18, 1978. The second event drew a crowd of almost 300,000 paid attendance.  Performers included Ted Nugent, Aerosmith, Santana, Dave Mason, Foreigner, Heart, Bob Welch, Stevie Nicks and Mick Fleetwood, Mahogany Rush and Rubicon.

By 1980, the Ontario Motor Speedway bonds were selling at approximately $0.30 on the dollar. Chevron Land Company, a division of Chevron Corporation recognized the opportunity to acquire the bonds and effectively foreclosed on the real estate. For approximately $10 million, Chevron acquired land which had a commercial real estate development value of $120 million, without regard to the historic significance or future potential of the speedway.

Subsequent development
Many of the grandstands and other infrastructure were sold off to other venues.  Section 10 and Section 20 (the grandstands on the east side of the arena) at the Paso Robles Event Center, also known as The California Midstate Fair), in Paso Robles were constructed from grandstands removed from the speedway.  Also several ticket booths were relocated from the speedway to the fair grounds.

The property remained vacant for several years until the mid-1980s when a Hilton hotel was built on turn 4 of the old speedway site. It was the first multiple-story building of its kind in the City of Ontario.

By the mid-2000s, development on the property had increased. In 2007, much of the remainder of the property became Piemonte, a mixed-use development with condominiums, business offices, and some retail stores. In the fall of 2008, the centerpiece of Piemonte opened: the Citizens Business Bank Arena (now Toyota Arena), an 11,000-seat sports and entertainment venue.  The arena is home to the AHL Ontario Reign and is built in the infield area of the old Ontario track.

The Ontario Mills shopping mall is located to the east, across the street from the former site of the Speedway. A minor tribute to the racing heritage of the property can be seen in the nearby street names (ex: Duesenberg Drive, Ferrari Lane, and others), in much the same way that the developed area that was formerly Riverside International Raceway reflects the same heritage, with roads named after famous drivers. On the west side of the former raceway is a park dedicated to OMS. The only remains of OMS is on the northwest side of the property where you can see the remains of turn 3 of the old oval in satellite views.

Subsequent racing events
After the failure of the California 500, the IndyCar series replaced the race with the Michigan 500 at Michigan International Speedway. Eight years later in 1988, Riverside International Raceway (in nearby Riverside) was also sold and demolished in favor of development.

(The California track was called the California Speedway before a naming rights deal was signed in February 2008.)

Past winners

California 500

Datsun Twin 200

From 1977 to 1980, a second Champ Car event was run at Ontario, sharing the bill with a stock car race. It was first joined by USAC Stock Car, and in 1980, when the race joined the CART calendar, by the NASCAR Winston West Series.

Questor Grand Prix
The race, held on 28 March 1971,  was open to Formula One and Formula A cars.

NASCAR Winston Cup history

Lap Records
The fastest ever qualifying lap on the 2.5-mile Oval is 44.325 seconds, set by Rick Mears in a Penske PC-7, during qualifying for the 1979 California 500. The fastest lap on the original 3.194-mile Road Course is 1:41.257, set by Jackie Stewart in a Tyrrell 001, during qualifying for the 1971 Questor Grand Prix. The official race lap records at Ontario Motor Speedway are listed as:

See also
Riverside International Automotive Museum

References

External links

Motorsport venues in California
Sports in Ontario, California
NASCAR tracks

Defunct motorsport venues in the United States
Demolished sports venues in California
Sports venues in San Bernardino County, California
Sports venues in the Inland Empire
IMSA GT Championship circuits
Champ Car circuits
Sports venues completed in 1970
1970 establishments in California
1980 disestablishments in California
Defunct companies based in Greater Los Angeles